The Haynes Automobile Company was an American automobile manufacturing company that produced automobiles in Kokomo, Indiana, from 1905 to 1924. The company was formerly known as the Haynes-Apperson company, and produced automobiles under that name from 1896 to 1905. Co-founder Elwood Haynes changed the name of the company after fellow co-founders Elmer and Edgar Apperson left to form the Apperson Brothers Automobile Company in 1901. The company was declared bankrupt in 1924 and went out of business in 1925.

History
The company's history starts in 1895 with the Haynes-Apperson company, which was renamed when the Apperson brothers left in 1905. Beginning in 1914, Haynes offered a "Light Six" at $1485. Their ads boasted that it was, "The result of 22 years successful experience in building motor cars." Haynes also proclaimed it "Americas greatest light six", that it "will travel 22 to 25 miles on one gallon of gas" and "has more than 1 horsepower to every 55 pounds of weight."

For 1916, Haynes introduced the "Light Twelve", and refined "Light Six" new series, Models 36 and 37.

In 1923, just before going out of business, Haynes introduced the 57, with a 121-inch (3073 mm) wheelbase, in five-seat four-door sedan, three-seat coupelet, and two-seat roadster, advertised as complete with front and rear bumpers, six disc (as opposed to wire) wheels, wind wings, sun visors, "artistically fashioned individual steps" (for the running boards), and "individual fenders".

The Haynes Pioneer
"The Haynes Pioneer" was the official factory magazine of the Haynes Automobile Company. It was named after Elwood Haynes's first car, the 1894 Haynes "Pioneer". The magazine featured articles like "Ocean to Ocean in One Day" and "The 1897 Haynes "Horseless Carriage" Again Becomes Property of the Haynes Company" (1916).

In popular culture
Film star Cleo Madison drove a Haynes "Light Six," as did composer and Oz film producer Louis F. Gottschalk and popular vocalist Billy Murray.

See also

List of defunct United States automobile manufacturers

Notes

Sources 
 Clymer, Floyd. Treasury of Early American Automobiles, 1877-1925. New York: Bonanza Books, 1950.
 National Museum of American History:  America on the Move

Brass Era vehicles
Veteran vehicles
1900s cars
1910s cars
1920s cars
Defunct motor vehicle manufacturers of the United States
Motor vehicle manufacturers based in Indiana
Companies based in Kokomo, Indiana
American companies established in 1905
Vehicle manufacturing companies established in 1905
Vehicle manufacturing companies disestablished in 1924
1905 establishments in Indiana
Defunct manufacturing companies based in Indiana